Muhammad Shafiq Qaadri  (born ) is a Canadian physician and former politician who represented Etobicoke North in the Legislative Assembly of Ontario from 2003 to 2018, sitting as a member of the Ontario Liberal Party. Qaadri is the first person of Pakistani origin to serve as a member of Provincial Parliament (MPP) in Ontario.

Early life and education
Qaadri was born in Chicago. His parents had immigrated from Pakistan. The family moved to Toronto in the 1970s.

Qaadri graduated from Upper Canada College in 1982, and from the University of Toronto Medical School in 1988. During his academic career, he won several scholarships including an English-Speaking Union Essay Prize to Oxford University and a Medical Research Council Scholarship in Clinical Neurosurgery.

Family 
Qaadri lives in Toronto with his wife and three children.

Medical career 
Before entering political life, Qaadri was commentator in the Canadian media for his discussions of medical issues (which he usually presented in a populist manner, intended for non-specialists). He has written over 75 articles on medicine for journals such as The Medical Post. Qaadri has been granted the position of Designated Medical Practitioner by the Canadian government.

His book The Testosterone Factor: A Practical Guide to Improving Vitality and Virility, Naturally, on the subject of andropause (described as the male equivalent of menopause), was released in 2006.

He was the keynote speaker at the 40th annual convention of the Islamic Medical Association of North America in July 2007. He is also a speaker at numerous community groups in the Greater Toronto Area, teaching how about the prevention and heart disease to South Asian groups.

Political career
Qaadri ran in the 1999 provincial election as the Liberal candidate in the riding of Etobicoke North. He lost to Progressive Conservative John Hastings by 1,446 votes in Etobicoke North.  Hastings announced his retirement in 2003, and Qaadri was able to win the riding by nearly 10,000 votes in the election that followed. He was reelected in 2007, 2011 and 2014. Qaadri is the first person of Pakistani origin to become a Member of Provincial Parliament in Ontario.

In the Legislature 
On October 23, 2003, he was named Parliamentary Assistant (PA) to Marie Bountrogianni in her capacity as Minister of Children and Youth Services. In 2007 he was named as PA to the Minister of Health Promotion and in 2011 as the PA to the Minister of Government Services.

In 2004, while working on recruiting new civil servants, he was quoted as saying "there's just too many white people" in Ontario's government agencies.

In May 2010, a rally against government cuts to pharmaceutical spending was held outside his governmental office. Protesters stated, "He is a doctor. We thought he should be saying something."

In September 2013, Qaadri introduced Bill 96, The Radon Awareness and Prevention Act. The bill would increase public awareness of the dangers of radon gas and mandate monitoring in all provincial buildings in the province.

As of July 2014, he served as Parliamentary Assistant to the Premier of Ontario.

In May 2015, Qaadri tabled a petition that requested that the government withdraw its policy of only purchasing BlackBerry smartphones for MPPs and their staff. It requested that other devices such as iPhones and Android smartphones be allowed. This was not the first petition on the topic by Qaadri, a similar petition with different language was tabled in April 2014. John Chen, CEO of BlackBerry Ltd., released a statement demanding an apology because the language of the petition "reflects poorly on all of Canada". Fellow MPP Daiene Vernile emphasized that Qaadri's petition is only his individual opinion and the Liberal government is "a strong supporter" of BlackBerry, and PC MPP Michael Harris said "if he wants the latest Apple apps he can do it on his own dime". Qaadri issued an apology in a Twitter post the following week, saying "I want to offer my sincere apologies for any offence caused by the language in my petition on technology last week".

On May 28, 2018, during the 2018 provincial election campaign, Shafiq attended a NDP rally in his riding hosted by leader Andrea Horwath, he was covered in the media for crashing and interrupting the event, he later apologized for his actions being "rash and inexcusable". He was subsequently defeated in the election by the Progressive Conservative Party leader Doug Ford, coming third, behind Ford and the NDP candidate respectively.

Electoral record

References

Notes

Citations

External links

1963 births
21st-century Canadian politicians
American emigrants to Canada
Canadian Muslims
Canadian politicians of Pakistani descent
Physicians from Ontario
Physicians of Pakistani descent
Politicians from Chicago
Living people
Ontario Liberal Party MPPs
University of Toronto alumni
Upper Canada College alumni